Communities in the Province of Saskatchewan, Canada include incorporated municipalities, unincorporated communities and First Nations communities. 

Types of incorporated municipalities include urban municipalities, rural municipalities and northern municipalities. Urban municipalities are further classified into four sub-types – cities, towns, villages and resort villages. Northern municipalities, which are located in the Northern Saskatchewan Administration District (NSAD), are further classified into three sub-types – northern towns, northern villages and northern hamlets. Rural municipalities are not classified into sub-types.

Types of unincorporated communities include hamlets and organized hamlets within rural municipalities and northern settlements within the NSAD.

The administration of rural municipalities, towns, villages, resort villages, organized hamlets and hamlets is regulated by The Municipalities Act, while the administration of cities is regulated by The Cities Act. Administration of northern towns, northern villages, northern hamlets and northern settlements (those within the NSAD) is regulated by The Northern Municipalities Act.

In the 2011 Census, Saskatchewan's communities combined for a total provincial population of 1,033,381.

Municipalities

Saskatchewan presently has 786 municipalities of various types (urban, rural and northern municipalities) and sub-types (cities, towns, villages, resort villages, northern towns, northern villages and northern hamlets).

Urban municipalities

Saskatchewan has 466 urban municipalities, which includes the sub-types of cities, towns, villages and resort villages.

Cities 

In Saskatchewan, towns must have a population above 5,000 in order to be granted city status. A city does not automatically revert to town status if the population drops below 5,000; this only occurs if the city council requests it, the majority of electors vote to revert to town status or the appropriate provincial minister is of the opinion that the reversion to town status is in the public interest.  The city of Melville retains city status as of 2010 despite dropping below 5,000 population in the 1990s.

Saskatchewan has 16 cities, including Lloydminster and not including Flin Flon.

Towns

In Saskatchewan, towns are formed from villages or resort villages with a population of at least 500 people. The council of the village or resort village must request the change to town status. When a town's population exceeds 5,000 people, the council may request a change to city status, but the change in incorporation level is not mandatory. Towns with shrinking populations are allowed to retain town status even if the number of residents falls below the 500 limit. For example, the towns of Fleming, Francis, and Scott have populations that have dropped under 500 people and are still qualified under town status.  Towns with populations below the limit may, however, revert to village or resort village status if the town council requests it.

Saskatchewan has 146 towns.

Villages

The people of an organized hamlet may request that the hamlet be incorporated as a village or resort village. In order to qualify, the hamlet must have been an organized hamlet for at least 3 years, have a population of at least 100 in the most recent census, and contain at least 50 separate dwelling units or business premises.

Saskatchewan has 260 villages.

Resort villages 

Saskatchewan has 40 resort villages.

Rural municipalities

A rural municipality is created by the Minister of Municipal Affairs by ministerial order via section 49 of The Municipalities Act. Saskatchewan has 296 rural municipalities, which are located in the central and southern portions of the province.

Saskatchewan has 296 rural municipalities.

Northern municipalities

Saskatchewan has 24 northern municipalities, which includes the sub-types of northern towns, northern villages and northern hamlets.

Northern towns
A northern town is a town in the Northern Saskatchewan Administration District. Its administration is regulated by The Northern Municipalities Act. A northern village may apply for town status when the actual resident population is at least 500.

Saskatchewan has two northern towns.

Northern villages
A northern village is located in the Northern Saskatchewan Administration District, and its administration is regulated by The Northern Municipalities Act. A northern hamlet may apply for northern village status when the population is at least 100 and the northern hamlet contains at least 50 separate dwelling units or business premises.

Saskatchewan has 11 northern villages.

Northern hamlets
A northern hamlet is located in the Northern Saskatchewan Administration District, and its administration is regulated by The Northern Municipalities Act.  A northern settlement may apply for northern hamlet status when the population is at least 50 and the northern settlement contains at least 25 separate dwelling units or business premises. Unlike hamlets and northern settlements, northern hamlets are municipal corporations.

Saskatchewan has 11 northern hamlets.

Unincorporated hamlets

In Saskatchewan, a hamlet is an unincorporated community that is under the jurisdiction of a rural municipality. It has at least five occupied dwellings situated on separate lots and at least 10 separate lots, the majority of which are an average size of less than one acre.

The Government of Saskatchewan recognizes three different types of hamlets – generic "hamlets", "special service areas" and "organized hamlets". Some organized hamlets in Saskatchewan are recognized as designated places by Statistics Canada, while unorganized hamlets are not.

Hamlets
Generic hamlets in Saskatchewan are under the jurisdiction of a rural municipality and do not have any decision-making powers or independent authorities.

The following are hamlets that are neither special service areas nor organized hamlets.

Special service areas
Like a generic hamlet, a special service area is under the jurisdiction of a rural municipality and does not have any decision-making powers or independent authorities. Unlike a generic hamlet, a special service area may form its own electoral division within the rural municipality and may have a different tax regime within the rural municipality compared to a generic hamlet.

Organized hamlets
Saskatchewan has 151 organized hamlets that are established via ministerial order and under the jurisdiction of rural municipalities within southern and central Saskatchewan. The people in a hamlet may apply for organized hamlet status within the rural municipality in which the hamlet is located.  The minimum requirements for organize status include a permanent population of at least 80 residents, 40 separate dwelling units or places of business, a taxable assessment of at least $4 million, and any other factor the minister may consider appropriate.

Northern settlements
A northern settlement is an unincorporated community in the Northern Saskatchewan Administration District, and its administration is regulated by The Northern Municipalities Act.

Saskatchewan has 11 northern settlements.

Ghost towns

A ghost town is a town that once had a considerable population, that has since dwindled in numbers causing some or all of its businesses and services to close, either due to the rerouting of a highway, railway tracks being pulled, or exhaustion of some natural resource.

First Nations communities

Indian reserves

Metis settlements

See also

List of cities in Canada
List of designated places in Saskatchewan

Notes

References

Other sources
 

Saskatchewan